Marcie & The Cookies were an Australian musical ensemble, made up of Marcie Jones and the three Cook sisters.  The all girl, vocal only group, were a rarity in Australia's "mod" music scene of the 1960s, dominated as it was by all male rock bands and solo artists.

Personnel
 Marcie Jones (vocals)
 Beverley Cook (vocals)
 Margaret Cook (vocals)
 Wendy Cook (vocals)

History
Marcie Jones started as a teenager with The Thunderbirds at Canterbury Ballroom and Preston Town Hall in Melbourne, Australia, in the early 1960s. She then went on to perform with Normie Rowe's band The Playboys and appeared on the "Go-Show". She issued five singles from 1965 to 1967 on the Sunshine label with some minor chart success.

1967-1972: Marcie and The Cookies
In 1967, on the suggestion of Normie Rowe, she teamed up with the Cook sisters (who were already performing as "The Cookies" ) in Brisbane. Marcie & The Cookies were in the mould of such U.S. acts as The Supremes and The Crystals. In early 1968 they came to the attention of "The Twilights" and "The Groove's" Manager Garry Spry, who was so impressed by them he became their manager. Spry got them a recording contract with EMI Music and put them with his all powerful entertainment agency A.M.B.O. Within 12 months they had become widely known for Marcie's powerful voice and the Cookies superb vocal harmonies and their synchronised stage movements as a result of their appearances on national TV shows, particularly on the pop music 'The Go!! Show'. They toured Australia as support act for overseas artists such as The Monkees on their Australian December 1968 tour.

That same year Marcie & The Cookies were presented the "Best Female Act for 1968" award by national pop magazine Go-Set and were awarded the "Critics Award" for the top Australian vocal act.

As a group they released only two singles. They were in demand for session work such as on the Tony Worsley & The Blue Jays track, "Something's Got a Hold on Me". During 1969 the group toured South East Asia for three months performing in Singapore, Malaysia, Hong Kong, Thailand and the Philippines. The tour included performances to Vietnam war servicemen at American bases.

After more than two years overseas Marcie decided to return home to Australia, leaving the Cook sisters to continue on as backing singers. With Peter Williams, they went on to form a new group called Spirit of Progress who recorded a couple of singles on the Decca label and were the support act also for Cliff Richard on tour.

1973- present: Marcie Jones solo 
On returning to Australia, Marcie Jones then resumed her solo career with a new manager and record label, Atlantic. She released an album and five singles between 1973 and 1976, the second of which, "Gonna Get Married", was her best chart success in 1974. The single "Baby I Need Your Loving" from 1975 was produced by Del Shannon.

Marcie has continued to perform both solo and with The Cookies (under the name of Marcie Jones and The Cookies), in stage shows, clubs, concerts and tours supporting major overseas artists until the present day. In their 40-year career they have toured with The Monkees, Gene Pitney, Cliff Richard, The Shadows, Roy Orbison, Tom Jones, Del Shannon, Ray Stevens and other performers. They perform a mixture of sixties and soul, ballads and rock.

More recently Marcie has embraced the country genre putting out a country CD in 1999.

In mid-2008, Marcie became a presenter on 100.7 Highlands FM, a community radio station based in the Macedon Ranges in Victoria, Australia, where she co-hosts a weekly show entitled "Blonde and Blonder".

In December 2008, Network Creative Services published the 400-page Marcie Jones autobiography 'Runs in the Blood'. The book deals with Marcie's entertainment career, the Australian franchise of Koala Blue, the break-up with Australian 'King of Pop' Normie Rowe, arriving at hospital to give birth with Gerry Marsden (of Merseybeat fame), having her second child born premature, and performing for the Pope.

Discography

Marcie and The Cookies singles

Marcie Jones Studio albums

Marcie Jones singles

References

 Noel McGrath's Australian Encyclopedia of Rock & Pop – 1978
 Mondo Weirdo – Australia in the Sixties – James Cockington (Photo – john Hearder) – 1992
 The Various Artist in Australia – Chris Spencer – 1990 – Moonlight Publishing
 An Australian Rock Discography – Chris Spencer  −1990 – Moonlight Publishing
 The Who's Who of Australian Rock – Chris Spencer  – Moonlight Publishing
 Gavin Ryan's Chart Books

External links
 Marcie Jones Autobiography: Runs In The Blood
 Marcie Jones Web Site
 Marcie Jones page at EntertainOz
 Pop Archives – All or Nothing Feature
 Pop Archives – I Would If I Could Feature
 Gavin Ryan's Chart Books
 Milesago – Reference to backing Tony Worsley & The Blue Jays on single Somethings Got A Hold On Me (Etta James Song)
 Reference to Marcie & The Cookies
 Legends of Sixties Rock

Victoria (Australia) musical groups
Australian girl groups